Onie may refer to:

 Onie, West Virginia, an unincorporated community in Wetzel County
 Open Network Install Environment, an open source software project for computer network switches

People
Rebecca Onie
Onie Wheeler